Dougan is a firm variety of tofu which is popular in Chinese cuisine.  It differs from regular tofu in that it is firm whereas tofu is soft.  It is made from soybeans with added calcium sulfate, and sometimes flavored with salt, soy sauce, and spices such as cinnamon, star anise, and licorice.

This food's name is composed of two syllables, dòu (豆, "bean"), and gān. This is different from tofu (which also has two syllables), but the second syllable in tofu is "fu" (腐). The full name is called doufu gan. 

It is important to distinguish between tofu and dougan, as it may not be appropriate to substitute tofu for dougan in recipes which call for dougan.

Dougan has a lower moisture content than tofu in that it is drier, and also by weight, where dougan has a greater bean-to-water ratio than tofu. This means that dougan contains more protein per gram, as the water density is less.

Dougan is different from Firm tofu, and is also different from Seitan.

See also
 List of soy-based foods

References 

 https://www.google.co.kr/search?q=%E8%B1%86%E5%B9%B2&newwindow=1&es_sm=122&source=lnms&tbm=isch&sa=X&ei=NOt7U8v9McGcugT8j4C4Ag&ved=0CAgQ_AUoAQ&biw=1280&bih=899

Chinese cuisine
Soy-based foods